Luo Ying (born 1991) is a Chinese badminton player. She specializes in doubles and partnered with her twin sister, Luo Yu. The twins competed at the 2016 Rio Summer Olympics but did not advance to the knock-out stage after placing third in the group stage.

Achievements

Asian Championships 
Women's doubles

Asian Junior Championships 
Girls' doubles

BWF Superseries 
The BWF Superseries, which was launched on 14 December 2006 and implemented in 2007, is a series of elite badminton tournaments, sanctioned by the Badminton World Federation (BWF). BWF Superseries levels are Superseries and Superseries Premier. A season of Superseries consists of twelve tournaments around the world that have been introduced since 2011. Successful players are invited to the Superseries Finals, which are held at the end of each year.

Women's doubles

  BWF Superseries Finals tournament
  BWF Superseries Premier tournament
  BWF Superseries tournament

BWF Grand Prix 
The BWF Grand Prix had two levels, the BWF Grand Prix and Grand Prix Gold. It was a series of badminton tournaments sanctioned by the Badminton World Federation (BWF) which was held from 2007 to 2017.

Women's doubles

  BWF Grand Prix Gold tournament
  BWF Grand Prix tournament

BWF International Challenge/Series 
Women's doubles

  BWF International Challenge tournament
  BWF International Series tournament

References

External links 
 

1991 births
Living people
Chinese twins
Twin sportspeople
Badminton players from Shandong
Chinese female badminton players
Badminton players at the 2016 Summer Olympics
Olympic badminton players of China
World No. 1 badminton players
21st-century Chinese women